Medicine pipe can refer to a ceremonial smoking pipe such as a

Chanunpa